OGH may refer to:

 Osmania General Hospital
 Order of the Golden Horseshoe
 Supreme Court of Justice (Austria) (German: Obersten Gerichtshof)
 Obsessed Gaga Hater